Homophron is a genus of fungi belonging to the family Psathyrellaceae.

The species of this genus are found in Europe, Northern America and Australia.

Species:

Homophron camptopodum 
Homophron cernuum 
Homophron particularis 
Homophron spadiceum

References

Psathyrellaceae
Agaricales genera